Lahcen Saber (born 1 January 1990) is a Moroccan cyclist.

Major results

2010
 8th GP Oued Eddahab, Les Challenges de la Marche Verte
2011
 2nd Under-23 time trial, National Road Championships
 9th Trophée de la Maison Royale, Challenge du Prince
 9th Grand Prix Khouribga, Challenge des phosphates
2013
 7th Overall Tour de Tipaza
 Les Challenges de la Marche Verte
7th GP Oued Eddahab
8th GP Sakia El Hamra
 8th Trophée de la Maison Royale, Challenge du Prince
2014
 10th Overall Tour of Rwanda
 10th Overall Tour du Maroc
2015
 1st Stage 6 (TTT) La Tropicale Amissa Bongo
 Challenge des phosphates
1st Grand Prix de Ben Guerir
2nd Grand Prix Fkih Ben Saleh
 National Road Championships
5th Road race
6th Time trial
 Challenge du Prince
5th Trophée de l'Anniversaire
6th Trophée de la Maison Royale
9th Trophée Princier
 Les Challenges de la Marche Verte
5th GP Oued Eddahab
6th GP Sakia El Hamra
 8th Overall Sharjah International Cycling Tour
 9th Overall Tour du Faso
2016
 3rd  Team time trial, African Road Championships
 6th Time trial, National Road Championships
2017
 7th Overall Tour du Cameroun
2022
 3rd Trophée Princier, Challenge du Prince
 4th Road race, National Road Championships
2023
 1st Stage 3 Tour du Sahel

References

External links
 
 
 

1990 births
Living people
Moroccan male cyclists